Tiana Alexandra-Silliphant (born Du Thi Thanh Nga, August 11, 1956) is a Vietnamese-American actress and filmmaker. Her indie movie From Hollywood to Hanoi was the first American documentary feature film shot in Vietnam by a Vietnamese-American. Tiana's life's work, Why Viet Nam? is about her personal story as a child of war and a widow of peace.

Alexandra made her feature film debut in Sam Peckinpah's The Killer Elite, co-written by her husband Stirling Silliphant. Currently, Alexandra is director of Hampton-Silliphant Productions with Sir Christopher Hampton.

Early life

Alexandra was born in Saigon, Vietnam in 1956. Her father Dư Phước Long, was a South Vietnamese politician, serving as Director of Press in Saigon and Cultural Attaché in Washington DC for the US allied administration of President Ngô Đình Diệm.

Alexandra's father moved the family to Fairfax, Virginia, in 1966 after the assassination of President Diệm. He worked at the South Vietnamese Embassy in Washington, DC, and pursued studies at Georgetown University's Diplomatic School and Johns Hopkins University's Graduate School of Advanced International Studies. He became Patrick Du Long and became a scriptwriter and newscaster for the Voice of America. He authored a book, The Dream Shattered: Vietnamese Gangs in America. In 1998, he was a candidate for the California State Assembly.

As a child of war refugees, the pre-teen attended Thomas Jefferson Junior High School in Arlington, Virginia during the worst years of desegregation. After being beaten up in the girl's room for being Vietnamese, Tiana sought out Bruce Lee as her Jeet Kune Do self defense master. Bruce, who was not yet an international movie star, honed her interest in both the performing arts and martial arts. Grandmaster Jhoon Rhee crowned her TianaKaratePrincess and introduced her to his best friend Bruce Lee, at his National Tournament in Washington, DC. Bruce Lee introduced Alexandra to his best friend, Stirling Silliphant, who was "Hollywood highest paid screenwriter". Silliphant had written Lee into numerous TV shows, including Longstreet, and an original two hour TV pilot called The Way of the Intercepting Fist. He believed in Bruce so much that he wrote Lee into his script of Raymond Chandler's Marlowe. Silliphant had also written most of the episodes for the acclaimed television series Route 66, and won an Oscar for Best Screenplay on the feature film In the Heat of the Night.

Alexandra and Stirling Silliphant were married in a ceremony at Chasen's Restaurant in West Hollywood on July 4, 1974. As reported by CBS News, the celebrity event included Robert Wagner, Natalie Wood, William Holden and Henry Mancini.

Career

Hollywood career
Silliphant's blockbuster films The Poseidon Adventure and The Towering Inferno, coupled with his newlywed status with Alexandra, led to their joint appearances on television talk and game shows such as The Mike Douglas Show, The Reed Ferrell Show and Tattletales during the mid-1970s.

Alexandra made her film debut in Sam Peckinpah's martial-arts thriller The Killer Elite with Robert Duvall and James Caan. She was the first Vietnamese-American to join the Screen Actors Guild.

In 1978, Alexandra starred with Angie Dickenson, Robert Wagner and Dennis Weaver as Holly Nagata in the ABC mini-series Pearl, which dramatized the events surrounding the Japanese attack on Pearl Harbor.

In 1981, Alexandra starred with Bruce Boxleitner and Brian Dennehy as Mai, a Vietnamese medic in the Warner Bros. made-for-television feature film Fly Away Home. The film critically examined the entanglement of politics and human suffering on the ground during the Vietnam War.

As an Asian actress breaking through racial stereotypes, Alexandra was invited to speak out on the realities of Hollywood typecasting at venues such as the Philippine Film Festival, where she appeared with Robert Duvall in the Symposium on Film Acting.

Alexandra starred as reporter Jan Du Long in an Aaron Spelling produced made-for-TV movie The Three Kings (1987). That same year she starred opposite Rod Steiger as Checkers Goldberg in the Kung Fu feature sendup, Catch The Heat.

With her martial arts finesse at top form in 1986, Alexandra produced a fitness program called Karatecize, combining elements of dance, combat art and original pop music. Martial arts champion Eric Lee collaborated with Alexandra on the self-defense segments of the show.

Music career
Between 1983 and 1985, Alexandra was managed by Bill Wyman of The Rolling Stones and created numerous pop songs and music videos for radio and MTV. Her "Dumped On", "Lust In The Jungle", and "Free As I Want To Be" music videos were shot on location in New Zealand, Hong Kong, Yugoslavia and Los Angeles.

Alexandra's music video of Bruce Lee, "Feel The Heat", was revamped in congruence with the Academy of Motion Picture Arts and Sciences 40th Anniversary Celebration of Bruce Lee's breakout film, Enter the Dragon.

From Hollywood to Hanoi
In 1988, Alexandra began pre-production on her first film, From Hollywood to Hanoi. Stemming from a trip taken earlier that year with a delegation of Vietnam veterans and filmmakers (in part on the advice of Alexandra's acting teacher Sandra Seacat, who predicted  that a return to Alexandra's roots would prove enormously empowering), the feature-length documentary was written, produced and directed by Alexandra, and executive produced by Oliver Stone—who had himself taken part in Alexandra's delegation to Hanoi, and strongly urged her to record the experience on film. From Hollywood to Hanoi was the first American film shot on location in Viet Nam.
 
It was shown at top film festivals and movie theatres across the U.S. and highlighted the plight of Amerasians, as well as the devastating effects of Agent Orange. It received acclaimed by New York Times and LA Times, Wall Street Journal, Variety, Hollywood Report, Boston Globe, Playboy, Washington Post and Time Magazine. Notable personalities including Allen Ginsberg, Oliver Stone, Michael Moore, and Studs Turkel became Alexandra's fans. But distribution was non-existent at the time for award-winning documentaries so the film's volunteer team led by the poet Steven Kauffman distributed the film in theatres and with Alexandra touring across America's college campuses.

Alexandra is focusing on her Viet Nam Trilogy after her husband Stirling launched her on a mission of a lifetime to return to her roots in Viet Nam and make films for healing and reconciliation. Together with Oliver Stone they formed IndoChina Film Arts Foundation, a nonprofit organization also known as Film Arts Foundation International. With over 30 years of filming in Viet Nam, Alexandra owns the world's most extensive library of footage shot in post-war Viet Nam over the last 3 decades. Post production will resume in Europe and Viet Nam to premiere on April 30, 2025, the 50th anniversary of the Fall of Saigon/ Liberation of Vietnam. Alexandra collaborates with distinguished writers and playwrights including Oscar winner Christopher Hampton and legendary composer, Philip Glass.

From Hollywood To Hanoi went into theatrical release in 1995, and was broadcast as part of the HBO Cinemax Vanguard Cinema series. It was well received by critics: Kevin Thomas of the LA Times lauded it as "moving and engrossing", and Vincent Canby of The New York Times hailed it as "an intense, personal, supremely self-confident feature."

The film was named "Best of the Fest" at Telluride Film Festival, and was nominated for "Best Non-Fiction Film" at Sundance International Festival, where it was presented by Michael Moore. The film was also screened on Capitol Hill to help lift the trade embargo by then Senator John Kerry.

Alexandra was invited to participate in international Women's Day with Betty Friedan, Stevie Wonder and Barbara Trent. Tiana made feature guest appearances to talk about her film on The Today Show with Bryant Gumbel, The PBS NewsHour with Charlayne Hunter Gault, and The KTLA Morning News with Regis Philbin.

Filming Vietnamese leaders

During three years of filming in Vietnam, Alexandra interviewed several former enemies of the U.S., who occupied high seats of power. They included Phạm Văn Đồng, and Lê Đức Thọ, a politician and diplomat who was awarded the Nobel Peace Prize along with United States Secretary of State Henry Kissinger in 1973. Lê Đức Thọ declined the award.

Alexandra also conducted interviews with General Võ Nguyên Giáp, the man Ho Chi Minh appointed to lead the North Vietnamese Army, which was victorious over the French and the Americans in the Indochina and Vietnam Wars. She was the first Westerner to interview Giáp after the Vietnam War, and returned to interview him several times, along with his wife, Co Ha, and their children over the next 25 years.

Indochina Film Arts Foundation
The aftermath of the war and trade embargoes left Vietnam the fifth poorest country in the world. Despite travel restrictions and her father's admonitions not to go, Alexandra returned to Vietnam with film crews to shoot From Hollywood to Hanoi, and a series of follow up films.

Alexandra co-founded the Indochina Film Arts Foundation with Oliver Stone in 1993 to organize cooperative projects in the fine arts, theatre, film, educational workshops, lectures and radio broadcasts. Projects were presented at the Viet Nam Cinema Dept. & Filmmakers Association in Hanoi, the Asian American Film Festivals in New York City and Los Angeles, the Cinéma Festival du Réel at the Centre Pompidou in Paris, the Directors Guild of America in Hollywood, and the Washington Project for the Arts in Washington DC. Alexandra has been a featured radio guest on NPR's Fresh Air Program with Terry Gross, as well as the Pacifica Network stations WBAI FM in New York, KFAI FM in Minneapolis and KPFK FM in Los Angeles.

Alexandra has lectured at Bennington College, Bryn Mawr College, Harvard University, Columbia University, Notre Dame University, University of Southern California, Berkeley, University of California, Santa Barbara and Stanford University. She was a panelist in the "My Lai 25 Years After" conference at Tulane University. Alexandra was also appointed Visiting Assistant Professor in the Department of Film Studies at Dartmouth College in 1993.

Since 1998, the Indochina Film Arts Foundation has conducted ongoing production workshops to advance the skills of aspiring Vietnamese filmmakers. Operations are based at Riva Studios in Ho Chi Minh City, and Hanoi Cinematique.

In 2013, Indochina Film Arts Foundation began doing business as Film Arts Foundation.

Ongoing documentary, education, and feature film
In 2000, Alexandra explored the Plain of Jars region of Laos to document the effects of carpet-bombing and unexploded ordnance on local populations. Her Bomb Art Project collected scraps of ordnance for artists to fashion into sculpture. The Bomb Art Project and Bombs Away mini-documentary were publicly presented at the Bergamot Station Art Center in Los Angeles.

Alexandra also documented the 30th Anniversary Reunion of Associated Press War Photographers in Ho Chi Minh City in 2005. Her documentary, Requiem, featured Pulitzer Prize–winning journalists and photojournalists Peter Arnett, and Nick Ut, as well as the local Vietnamese youth culture that had moved on from the war.

In 2007, Alexandra went on a world tour with Oscar and Tony winning author Christopher Hampton to help manage and promote his work on the feature film Atonement. Hampton was subsequently nominated for an Oscar for Best Writing (Adapted Screenplay) on the film.

A Tony Award Celebration was organized by Alexandra in 2009 in conjunction with the successful run of Yazmina Reza's Broadway play God of Carnage. The event celebrated the play's six Tony nominations and three wins, and honored author Christopher Hampton's 50 plays and screenplays. James Gandolfini, Marcia Gay Harden, Philip Glass and Phillip Noyce participated in the short documentary that Alexandra created from the event.

In 2009 Alexandra filmed an odyssey to find the spirit of Michael Jackson in Beverly Hills and Viet Nam, with Le Ly Hayslip - the author and subject of Oliver Stone's feature film Heaven and Earth. Le Ly and Tiana visited the site of Jackson's death and documented the throngs of impersonators carrying on his legacy in both the U.S. and Vietnam.

As co-owner of Christopher Hampton's stage play The Talking Cure, Alexandra was instrumental in developing the project into a feature film directed by David Cronenberg. The film, retitled A Dangerous Method, starred Michael Fassbender as Swiss psychotherapist Carl Jung, and Keira Knightley as his patient and mistress. Alexandra is credited as Associate Producer on the 2011 release, and documented the behind the scenes development of the project.

In 2012, Alexandra and Christopher Hampton formed Hampton Silliphant Management & Productions, which presented the play Appomattox at the Guthrie Theater in Minneapolis, Minnesota. The play concerns itself with historic events in America, 100 years apart in time: the historic meetings between Generals Ulysses S. Grant and Robert E. Lee, in tandem with Abraham Lincoln and Fredrick Douglass in 1865, and the later machinations of Lyndon Johnson, J. Edgar Hoover and Martin Luther King – which ultimately led to the passage of the Voting Rights Act of 1965. Appomattox was also performed as an opera with Philip Glass at The Kennedy Center in 2015.

In 2020, Alexandra went on location in Malaysia to join partner Christopher Hampton and crew, filming an international TV mini-series The Singapore Grip. Alexandra documented "the making of" the six-episode drama - which portrayed the intrigues and ultimate upheaval of British colonialism during the Fall of Singapore in WWII.

Alexandra's film The General & Me focuses on her 25-year relationship with General Võ Nguyên Giáp, Ho Chi Minh's trusted military strategist during the Indochina and Vietnam Wars.

Filmography
As actress
1975: The Killer Elite (alternative title: The agents elite) - Tommie
1978: Pearl (alternative title: Pearl Harbor) (TV Mini-Series) - Holly Nagata
1981: Fly Away Home (TV Movie) - Mai
1987: Catch the Heat (video title in the Federal Republic of Germany: Fire Game) - Checkers Goldberg
1987: The Three Kings (TV Movie) - Jan DuLong (final film role)

As director
1992: From Hollywood to Hanoi
2017: The General and Me
2020: The Singapore Grip: Behind the Scenes

As producer
1992: From Hollywood to Hanoi
2011: A Dangerous Method

Other performances (e.g. herself)
1986: Karatix
1992: From Hollywood to Hanoi

Nominations
 1993: Nominated for the "Grand Jury Prize" in the Category: Documentary ( Documentary) the Sundance Film Festival for the film From Hollywood to Hanoi.

References

External links
 

1961 births
Living people
Vietnamese emigrants to the United States
American film actresses
21st-century American women